Mon Mane Na may refer to:

 Mon Mane Na (1992 film), a Bengali film directed by Indar Sen and starring Prosenjit
 Mon Mane Na (2008 film), a Bengali film directed by Sujit Guha and starring Dev and Koyel Mullick
 Mon Mane Na (TV series), 2021-2022 Indian series starring Pallavi Dey, Samm Batyacharyya, and Anjana Basu